Qala Patxa (Aymara qala stone, patxa ridge, "stone ridge", possibly erroneously also spelled Calapatia (from Calapatja)) is a mountain in the Andes of southern Peru, about  high. It is located in the Moquegua Region, Mariscal Nieto Province, Carumas District. Qala  Patxa lies southeast of Willkani.

References

Mountains of Moquegua Region
Mountains of Peru